Andrea Costa Imola is an Italian professional basketball team based in Imola, Emilia-Romagna. The side is playing in the second division Serie A2 as of the 2015-16 season.

History
Andrea Costa Basket was founded on 4 October 1967, with the name an hommage to a former Imola of the same name.
The club started playing in the amateur Prima divisione before moving up to the Promozione after one season, staying there until 1980-81.
Playing one season in Serie D, the side then was promoted to the Serie C2 where it would play from 1982 to 1986 after which it joined the Serie B2.
It won the league on its first try, moving up to the highest amateur division, the Serie B1, where it would stay for eight years.
At the end of the 1994-95 season, Andrea Costa won a promotion to the professional Serie A2.

The 1996-97 would see Imola beat favourites Livorno in the promotion playoffs and reach the Serie A.
Under the leadership of Vincenzo Esposito, the side reached the playoffs in 1998-99, losing in the quarterfinals to rivals Fortitudo Bologna.
The club managed to qualify for European competitions in 1999-2000 (Korać Cup) and 2000-01 (Saporta Cup) but would be relegated at the end of 2001.
The next decade was more difficult for Imola, with the club relegated thrice on the court (2004, 2007, 2009) before being saved by other club's bankruptcies.

Arena
Andrea Costa played in the PalaRuggi until 1995, with the promotion to the Serie A2 meaning the side had to find a suitable arena, moving to the Palatenda.
Another promotion to the Serie A in 1998, meant the side had to move again, this time to the PalaCattani in neighbouring Faenza.
Later returning to the PalaRuggi, the side plays there as of the 2015-16 season.

2015–16 roster

Notable former players 

2000's
  Pietro Aradori 1 season: '06-'07
  Darren Kelly 1 season: '06-'07
   Nicholas James George 1 season: '06-'07
   Donte Mathis 1 season: '06-'07
  BJ McKie 1 season: '05-'06
  David Brkic 1 season: '05-'06
  Bingo Merriex 1 season: '04-'05
  Michael Campbell 1 season: '04-'05
  Jobey Thomas 1 season: '03-'04
  Elton Tyler 1 season: '03-'04
  Gerrod Abram 1 season: '03-'04
  Michael Hicks 2 seasons: '02-'03, '05-'06
   Brian Shorter 1 season: '02-'03
  Harper Williams 1 season: '01-'02
  Sylvester Gray 1 season: '01-'02
   Juan Manuel Moltedo 2 seasons: '00-'02
  Marques Bragg 1 season: '00-'01
  Kevin Thompson 1 season: '00-'01

1990's
  Brian Evans 1 season: '99-'00
  Ian Lockhart 1 season: '99-'00
  Vincenzo Esposito 5 seasons: '98-'01, '02-'03, '04-'05
  Yamen Sanders 2 seasons: '98-'99, '00-'01
  Christopher Jent 1 season: '98-'99
  Steve Burtt Sr. 1 season: '97-'98
   Matthew Alosa 1 season: '96-'97
  Gianluca Lulli 1 season: '96-'97
  Paolo Bortolon 4 seasons: '95-'99
  Francesco Foiera 4 seasons: '95-'99
  Bill Jones 3 seasons: '95-'98

Sponsorship names
Throughout the years, due to sponsorship, the club has been known as:

 Benati Imola (1990–91)
 Leonardo Imola (1991–93)
 Fanti Imola (1993–95)
 Casetti Imola (1995–98)
 Termal Imola (1998–99)
 Lineltex Imola (1999-2001)
 Fillattice Imola (2001–02)
Esse.Ti Imola (2002–03)
Zarotti Imola (2005–07)

References

External links 
   Retrieved 23 August 2015
 Serie A historical results  Retrieved 23 August 2015

1967 establishments in Italy
Basketball teams established in 1967
Basketball teams in Emilia-Romagna
Imola